The FAI Cup 1933–34 was the thirteenth awarding of Ireland's premier cup competition prize, The Football Association of Ireland Challenge Cup or FAI Cup. The tournament began on 13 January 1934 and concluded on 17 March with the final held at Dalymount Park, Dublin. An official attendance of 21,000 people watched Cork claim their sole FAI Cup title by defeating inaugural winners, St James's Gate.

First round

Second round

Semi-finals

Replay

Replay(2)

Final

Notes
A.  From 1923-1936, the FAI Cup was known as the Free State Cup.

B.  Attendances were calculated using gate receipts which limited their accuracy as a large proportion of people, particularly children, attended football matches in Ireland throughout the 20th century for free by a number of means.

References
General

External links
FAI Website

1933-34
1933–34 in Irish association football
FAI Cup